Cunt, is the third full-length album by Australian grindcore band Blood Duster. Despite, or because of, its deliberately vulgar and anti-commercialist title,  Cunt proved to be the band's most successful release to that point of their career, earning them high amounts of radio play, especially by Triple J, even though its title did make life difficult for the distributors and it did not make it into many shops for the same reason.

The title was not the only point of controversy about this album. The original cover, an image of a decapitated Fred Durst, drawn by Wes Benscoter, was dismissed by their label, Relapse Records, for fear of getting sued. The Australian release was issued in a plain black cover with the word "cunt" centred and printed in a small font. The cover displayed on the right greatly resembles that of American band Ween's 1994 album Chocolate and Cheese.

Cunt also saw the release of the band's first single, "Pornstorestiffi" in the form of a nu metal parody video played on Channel [V], a channel on which the band was also interviewed.

Cunt was a slight return to a more death/grind style after their Southern rock-themed release Str8 Outta Northcote. The album also features a cover of the Impetigo song Dis-Organ-Ized, which originally featured on the tribute Wizards Of Gore, released on Razorback Records.

According to the liner notes, Cunt has 93 riffs and 2068 words, and a large amount of porn-themed audio samples from movies, mostly from Boogie Nights, Orgazmo and Australian film Idiot Box.

Because of the success of this album, Cole Clark Guitars decided to use Blood Duster to endorse their products, producing for them a guitar with the 'Cunt' logo across it. Guitarist Belthrower still uses this guitar.

Track listing
"We Are the Word Police" – 1:12
"Big Fat Arse" – 1:28
"Another Slack Arsed Aussie Band" – 1:20
"Porn Store Stiffi" – 1:31
"Pissing Content" – 1:00
"I Just Finished Sucking Off Metalheads in the Men's Urinals" – 0:38
"Hoochie Mumma" – 1:30
"I Love It When Joe Pesci Swears" – 0:53
"Stock Takin'" – 0:39
"Let's All Fuck" – 0:17
"A Track Suit Is Not Appropriate Metal Apparel" – 0:28
"The Corpse Song" – 2:17
"Fuck You Scene Boy" – 0:18
"Is Killing Clones Illegal?" – 1:05
"Don't Call Me Homeboy Ya' Cunt" – 1:12
"Spefeven" – 0:49
"The Object Is to Shift Some Units" – 0:58
"Sweet Meat" – 5:10
"Dis-Organ-Ized" (Impetigo cover) – 5:09

Credits
Jason Fuller - bass, vocals
Matt Rizzo - drums
Matt Collins - guitar
Tony Forde - vocals

Release history

References

Blood Duster albums
2001 albums
Relapse Records albums